The Wilhelm Archipelago is an island archipelago off the west coast of the Antarctic Peninsula in Antarctica.

Wilhelm Archipelago consists of numerous islands, the largest of which are Booth Island and Hovgaard Island. The archipelago extends from Bismarck Strait southwest to Lumus Rock, off the west coast of Graham Land. It was discovered by a German expedition under Eduard Dallmann, 1873–74. He named them for Wilhelm I, then German Emperor and King of Prussia.

Island groups
 Anagram Islands
 Argentine Islands
 Betbeder Islands
 Cruls Islands
 Dannebrog Islands
 Myriad Islands
 Roca Islands
 Vedel Islands
 Wauwermans Islands
 Yalour Islands

See also
 Ambrose Rocks
 Bradley Rock
 Guéguen Point
 Petermann Island
 Southwind Passage

References

 
Islands of Antarctica
Archipelagoes of the Southern Ocean